Ekaterini Voggoli (born October 30, 1970 in Larissa) is a retired Greek discus thrower.

She was the 2002 European champion and 2003 World Championship bronze medalist. In June 2004 she beat Anastasia Kelesidou's Greek record by 2 centimetres, throwing 67.72 metres in Athens.

Achievements

References

1970 births
Living people
Greek female discus throwers
Athletes from Larissa
Athletes (track and field) at the 1996 Summer Olympics
Athletes (track and field) at the 2000 Summer Olympics
Athletes (track and field) at the 2004 Summer Olympics
Olympic athletes of Greece
World Athletics Championships medalists
Greek European Athletics champions (track and field)
World Athletics Championships athletes for Greece
Mediterranean Games silver medalists for Greece
Mediterranean Games medalists in athletics
Athletes (track and field) at the 1993 Mediterranean Games